HMS Excellent was a 74-gun third-rate ship of the line of the Royal Navy, launched at Harwich on 27 November 1787. She was the captaincy of John Gell before he was appointed an admiral.

Excellent was at Plymouth on 20 January 1795 and so shared in the proceeds of the detention of the Dutch naval vessels, East Indiamen, and other merchant vessels that were in port on the outbreak of war between Britain and the Netherlands.

Excellent took part in the Battle of Cape St Vincent in 1797.

On 9 October 1799, Excellent chased the 18-gun . Aréthuse attempted to flee but part of her rigging broke during the night, and Excellent caught her. After a brief fight, Aréthuse struck her colours. She was recommissioned in the Royal Navy as HMS Raven.

On 9 April 1802, the 8th West India Regiment revolted in Dominica. They killed three officers, imprisoned the others and took over Fort Shirley. On the following day, which was anchored in Prince Rupert's Bay, sent a party of marines ashore to restore order. The mutineers fired upon the Magnificent with no effect. Excellent, the frigate , and the sloop  assisted Magnificent, also supplying marines.

On 12 April, Governor Cochrane entered Fort Shirley with the Royal Scots Regiment and the 68th Regiment of Foot. The rebels were drawn up on the Upper Battery of Fort Shirley with three of their officers as prisoners and presented arms to the other troops. They obeyed Cochrane's command to ground their arms but refused his order to step forward. The mutineers picked up their arms and fired a volley. Shots were returned, followed by a bayonet charge that broke their ranks and a close range fire fight ensued. Those mutineers who tried to escape over the precipice to the sea were exposed to grape-shot and canister fire from Magnificent.

Fate
In 1820, Excellent was reduced to a 58-gun ship. From 1830 she was serving as a training ship. She was broken up in 1835.

References

Bibliography

External links
 

Ships of the line of the Royal Navy
Arrogant-class ships of the line
1787 ships
Ships built in Harwich